Ranfurly Point is a low rocky point marking the convergence of the Beardmore and Keltie Glaciers, at the northern extremity of Supporters Range. Named by D.B. Rainey, Cartographic Branch of the Department of Lands and Survey, New Zealand, for Lord Ranfurly, Governor of New Zealand, 1897–1904.

Headlands of the Ross Dependency
Dufek Coast